Big World is a 1986 live album of original songs by Joe Jackson. The album was recorded in front of an invited audience at the Roundabout Theatre, East 17th Street in New York City on 23, 24 and 25 January 1986 (except "Man in the Street", recorded during rehearsals on 22 January). The songs are loosely linked by lyrics covering a general theme of post-World War II international relations and global travel.

Production
Jackson's intent for the recording was to capture the intensity and spontaneity of a live performance, but without the distraction of noise from the crowd. He requested that the audience remain silent while the performances of his band were recorded. 

Unlike most other pop music recordings, which use multitrack recording techniques, no post-recording mixing or overdubbing was performed on the album. The music was mixed live from microphones on each musical instrument, then sent directly to a two track stereo digital tape recorder. 

Regarding the album, Joe says: ‘I want to clear up two myths about this record which still crop up all the time. Myth 1: During the live recording of the album, the audience was forbidden to applaud. Fact: There was plenty of applause. We were just playing a lot of unfamiliar material, and recording it for an album, so the audience were asked to hold it until they were sure a song was finished. They understood this and there was no problem. Myth 2: It’s a double album with a side missing. Fact: This was my first album to be released on CD, where the running time was not an issue. I was having a hard time deciding what to leave out for the LP, though, and I suggested making a 3-sided one, and selling it for the price of a regular album. Much to my surprise, the record company said yes. So rather than a side missing, you got an extra side. Critics, of course, hadn’t had to pay for it.’

Release
The LP release was a double album, but only three sides had music. The fourth side label stated "there is no music on this side", and the record had a groove that quickly led to the inner to prevent stylus damage. The CD release contained the same 15 tracks on one disc.

The front cover of the album (work by Serge Clerc) features the phrase "Big World" in French, Persian, Mandarin Chinese, Greek, Dutch, Korean, Thai, Russian, Irish Gaelic, Armenian, Hindi, Hebrew, Indonesian, Arabic, and Polish. The back cover features the same phrase in Vietnamese, Swedish, Swiss German, Turkish, Spanish, Swahili, Italian, Danish, Finnish, Welsh, and Hungarian.

The album included an eight-page booklet which included the lyrics to all fifteen songs and recording information in English, German, Japanese, French, Italian and Spanish.

The original South African LP release featured all 15 songs on one disc.

Track listing 
All songs written and arranged by Joe Jackson. Produced by Joe Jackson and David Kershenbaum.

The track sequence differed between the compact disc, LP and cassette releases.

Personnel 
 Musicians
 Joe Jackson - piano, recorder, accordion, melodica, vocals
 Vinnie Zummo - guitars, vocals
 Rick Ford - bass, acoustic guitar, vocals
 Gary Burke - drums
 Joy Askew, Nikki Gregoroff, Peter Hewlett, Curtis King Jr. - extra backing vocals

 Production
 Joe Jackson and David Kershenbaum - producer
 Michael Frondelli - recording engineer
 Guy Charbonneau - remote recording technician
 Dave Roberts - onstage technician
 Dave Hewitt - remote recording production coordinator
 Eddie Ciletti - digital tape technician

Covers 
 Amy Fox covered "Be My Number Two/Shanghai Sky" and Mary Lee's Corvette covered "Home Town" on the 2004 album Different for Girls: Women Artists and Female-Fronted Bands Cover Joe Jackson.

Charts

Weekly charts

Year-end charts

Sales and certifications

References

External links 
 Big World album information at The Joe Jackson Archive

Joe Jackson (musician) live albums
1986 live albums
A&M Records live albums
Albums produced by David Kershenbaum